Chandesi, also Chandeshi or Chambeshi, is a small town on the Kasama-Mpika Road (M1 Road) in Kanchibiya District, Muchinga Province of Zambia. It is named after the Chambeshi River which passes to adjacent to it.

Location

The geographical coordinates of the town are:10°57'02.0"S, 31°04'06.0"E (Latitude:-10.950556; Longitude:31.068333).

Overview
Chandesi lies on the M1 Road, which is the main highway that connects Mpika in the south to Kasama and Mpulungu, at the southern tip of Lake Tanganyika, in the north. The town is built along the shores of the Chambeshi River, as it flows from its source near Lake Tanganyika to the Bangweulu Swamps.

See also
 TAZARA Railway
 Great North Road

References

Populated places in Northern Province, Zambia